Philippe Roncoli is a French former competitive figure skater. He is the 1983 World Junior silver medalist, 1986 NHK Trophy bronze medalist, and 1987 French national champion. Roncoli placed seventh at the 1987 European Championships in Sarajevo and 18th at the 1987 World Championships in Cincinnati. He was coached by Alain Giletti in Chamonix.

Competitive highlights

References 

 French Wikipedia

French male single skaters
Living people
World Junior Figure Skating Championships medalists
Year of birth missing (living people)